Princess Badiya bint Hassan (born 23 March 1974) is a Jordanian princess. She is the third daughter of Prince Hassan bin Talal and Princess Sarvath al-Hassan, she is also the cousin of King Abdullah II.

She chairs the committee of the Mosaic Awards for Talent in London and is a member of its board. She has also contributed to reinforcing the foundation's work ever since it was created.

Education

 Amman Baccalaureate School
 Sherborne School for Girls
 University of Oxford - B.A. Hons in History
 College of Law - Diploma
 London School of Economics - LL.M. in Public international law

Career
After studying law at The College of Law in London, Princess Badiya qualified as a barrister in 1998, being called to the Bar at Lincoln's Inn. She is the first member of the Jordanian Royal Family to become a lawyer (She is a non-practicing lawyer).

The Princess is a member of and has collaborated with various international organizations,  she gained experience working for the United Nations agencies in Geneva and New York. Her work mostly focuses on promoting interfaith and cross-cultural understanding, human rights and the rights of asylum seekers and refugees. She also participates in the activities of charities and programs that work to support youth and women.

Among her many commitments in the UK:

 She is the Chairman of Mosaic, a mentoring programme founded by Prince Charles. "Mosaic is a Muslim-led charity mentoring young people and offering them positive role models."
 sponsor of the Development and growth of Literacy (DIL)-UK
 sponsor of youth work
 sponsor of Asian Women of Achievement Awards

Her Highness is regularly invited to give lectures on Islam, interfaith relations, human rights and other related issues.

Marriage
Princess Badiya became engaged to Khaled Edward Blair in September 2004 and married him in Amman on June 24, 2005.

References

1974 births
Living people
People educated at Sherborne Girls
Alumni of Christ Church, Oxford
Alumni of The University of Law
Alumni of the London School of Economics
Members of Lincoln's Inn
British barristers
Jordanian emigrants to the United Kingdom
British Muslims
House of Hashim
Jordanian princesses
Jordanian people of Pakistani descent
Jordanian Muslims
Sunni Muslims
People from Amman
British women lawyers
Suhrawardy family
Jordanian people of Bengali descent